Alberhill Canyon, is an informally named valley and arroyo in the Temescal Mountains of Riverside County, California.  It is named for the former mining settlement and populated place of Alberhill that lay opposite the mouth of the arroyo at its confluence with Temescal Creek.

The arroyo is ephemeral, to its mouth in the wetter years, during the wet season in Southern California, otherwise being dry for the balance of the year. From its source Alberhill Canyon trends southwest to enter Walker Canyon 0.7 miles north northeast of Alberhill, California. 

Prior to the construction of the freeway the Alberhill Canyon arroyo ran into Temescal Creek in the vicinity of the drain, the creek was moved during the freeway construction to the south of the freeway.

References

Canyons and gorges of California
Landforms of Riverside County, California
Temescal Mountains
Tributaries of Temescal Creek